, there were 21,638 hospitals in China, forming an important part of the country's healthcare system. The most notable hospitals are listed below for each province of China.

Beijing

301 Hospital
302 Hospital
307 Hospital
Aerospace Center Hospital
Amcare Women and Children Hospital
Arrail Dental Clinic
APMG Puhua International Hospitals – Shuangjing
APMG Puhua International Hospitals – Temple of Heaven
Beijing 21st Century Hospital
Beijing An-ding Hospital
Beijing Anzhen Hospital Affiliated to Capital Medical University
Beijing Buwai Hospital
Beijing Chaoyang An-yuan Hospital of Traditional Chinese Medicine
Beijing Chaoyang Dongba Hospital
Beijing Chaoyang Guanzhuang Hospital
Beijing Chaoyang Hospital of Traditional Chinese Medicine
Beijing Chaoyang Huagonglu Hospital
Beijing Chaoyang Huizhong Hospital
Beijing Chaoyang Jingsong Hospital
Beijing Chaoyang No. 2 Hospital
Beijing Chaoyang Wali Hospital
Beijing Chaoyang Women and Children's Healthcare Center
Beijing Chaoyang Xiaohongmeng Hospital
Beijing Charity Hospital
Beijing Children's Hospital
Beijing Chi Kang Hospital
Beijing Chongwen Children's Hospital
Beijing Chongwen Guangming Hospital
Beijing Chongwen Hospital of Traditional Chinese Medicine
Beijing Chongwen Mouchun Hospital
Beijing Chongwen No. 1 People's Hospital
Beijing Chongwen Stomatological Hospital
Beijing Chongwen Zhengda Hospital
Beijing Communication Hospital of the Ministry of Communication
Beijing Construction Workers Hospital
Beijing Ditan Hospital
Beijing Erlong Road Hospital
Beijing Friendship Hospital
Beijing Fulong Hospital
Beijing Fuxing Hospital
Beijing Geriatric Hospital
Beijing Gulou Hospital of Traditional Chinese Medicine
Beijing Guotai Hospital
Beijing Hepingli Hospital
Beijing Hospital
Beijing Hospital for Stomatology
Beijing Hospital of Traditional Chinese Medicine
Beijing Huguoshi Hospital of Traditional Chinese Medicine
Beijing Huiming Hospital
Beijing Intech Eye Hospital
Beijing Jingcheng Dermatopathy Hospital
Beijing Jishuitan Hospital
Beijing Massage Hospital
Beijing Maternity Hospital
Beijing New Century International Hospital for Children
Beijing No. 1 Hospital affiliated to Beijing Medical University
Beijing No. 2 Hospital
Beijing No. 6 Hospital
Beijing Police Hospital
Beijing Post Hospital
Beijing Puren Hospital
Beijing Qing Gong Hospital
Beijing Royal Integrative Medicine Hospital, Chanping District
Beijing Shunyi Hospital
Beijing Tiantan Hospital
Beijing Tibet Hospital
Beijing Tongren Hospital
Beijing United Family Hospital and Clinics
Beijing University International Hospital
Beijing Wan Jie Hospital
Beijing Xuanwu Baizhifan Hospital
Beijing Xuanwu Chunshu Hospital
Beijing Xuanwu Dazhalan Hospital
Beijing Xuanwu Guangwai Hospital
Beijing Xuanwu Guangnei Hospital
Beijing Xuanwu Hospital of Traditional Chinese Medicine
Beijing Xuanwu Taoranting Hospital
Beijing Xuanwu Tianqiao Hospital
Bethune International Peace Hospital
Changyang Hospital
China Rehabilitation Research Center
CMU Beijing Chaoyang Hospital
CMU Beijing Fuwai Hospital (Cardiovascular disease)
CMU Beijing Fuxing Hospital (Capital Medical University)
China-Japan Friendship Hospital
DongFang Hospital
East Area Hospital of Beijing Chaoyang Red Cross
Eastern Hospital of Beijing – Eastern Hospital of Beijing Traditional Chinese Medical University
Fuwai Heart Hospital & Cardiovascular Institute
General Hospital of Chinese People's Armed Police Forces
General Hospital of the Chinese People's Liberation Army
Guang An Men's Hospital
Haidian Changquing Hospital of Beijing
Jihua Hospital
OASIS International Hospital
Orient Hospital
Peking Union Medical College Hospital
People's Hospital Affiliated to Beijing Medical University
PKU 3rd People's Hospital
PKU 6th Hospital (Mental Care)
PKU Hospital
PKU Oral Care Hospital
Puhua International Hospital – Shuangjing
Red Cross Chaoyang Hospital affiliated to Capital Medical University
Sanfine International Hospital
Sekwa Eye Hospital, Beijing SEH
Shuguang Hospital of Beijing Chaoyang Red Cross
SK Hospital
Xinhua Hospital of Beijing Red Cross
Xuanwu Hospital of Capital Medical University

Gansu
There are over 300 hospitals in Gansu Province.   The following are some of the notable hospitals in Gansu Province:
 First People's Hospital of Lanzhou, Lanzhou
 Second People's Hospital of Gansu (see Borden Memorial Hospital, predecessor)
 Second People's Hospital of Lanzhou, Lanzhou
 Third People's Hospital of Gansu
 Baiyin First People's Hospital
 Chinese People's Liberation Hospital Number 1
 Dunhuang Hospital, Dunhuag
 Gansu Province Hospital of Traditional Chinese Medicine
 Gansu Tumor Hospital
 General Military Hospital
 Jiuquan People's Hospital, Jiuquan
 Lanzhou University First Hospital, Lanzhou
 Lanzhou University Second Hospital, Lanzhou
 Lanzhou People's Hospital Number 3, Lanzhou
 Lanzhou Heavy Ion Cancer Treatment Center, Lanzhou (joint venture by Sheng De Group, the city government and Chinese Academy of Sciences, Lanzhou Branch, Institution of Modern Physics)
 Lanzhou Military Hospital, Lanzhou
 People's Hospital of Gansu
 Wuwei People's Hospital, Wuwei
 Yumen Number 1 People's Hospital, Yumen

Guangdong

Sun Yat-sen University Cancer Center
Xinhui People's Hospital
Clifford Hospital
Peking University Shenzhen Hospital

Guangxi
People's Hospital of Guangxi Zhuang Autonomous Region

Hainan
Haikou City People's Hospital

Hangzhou
Zhejiang Cancer Hospital

Hong Kong

Hubei 
Wuhan Jianghan Maternity and Child Health Care Center
Zhongnan Hospital of Wuhan University
Wuhan Central Hospital
Renmin Hospital of Wuhan University
Wuhan No.1 Hospital
Western and Traditional Chinese Medicine Combined Hospital of Wuhan Xinzhou District
Wuhan Jiangxia District Traditional Chinese & Western Medicine Hospital
Hanxi Branch of Wuhan Western and Traditional Chinese Medicine Combined Hospital
Wuhan Hospital of Combined West and Traditional Chinese Medicine
Wuhan University Stomatological Hospital
Wuhan Shunyuan Hospital of Traditional Chinese Medicine
Wuhan Brain Hospital
Wuhan Textile University Hospital
Wuhan Central Hospital Huaqiao Out-patient Department
Wuhan University Zhongnan Hospital Emergency Medical Service
Wuhan Jingyue Hospital
Wuhan Jinyintan Hospital, Jinyintan Avenue/ Yintan Road
Wuhan Tuberculosis Hospital
Wuhan Guanggu Central Hospital
Wuhan Union Hospital
Huoshenshan Hospital (Construction began 23 January 2020; scheduled operational by 3 February)
Leishenshan Hospital (Construction began 25 January 2020; scheduled operational by 5 February)
Xinhua Hospital (Hubei), a hospital located in Hankou, Wuhan, which is a teaching hospital of Tongji Medical College, Huazhong University of Science and Technology

Hunan 

The Second Xiangya Hospital of Central South University
The Third Xiangya Hospital of Central South University

Macau

Sichuan
West China Medical Center of Sichuan University

Nanjing

Zhongda Hospital, Southeast University
First Affiliated Hospital of Nanjing Medical University
Jiangsu Provincial People’s Hospital
Jiangsu Provincial Stomatology Hospital
Jiangsu Provincial Traditional Chinese Medicine Hospital
Nanjing Gulou Hospital
Nanjing Brain Hospital
Nanjing General Hospital of Nanjing Military Command

Nanjing General Military Hospital
Nanjing Ophthalmology Hospital
Nanjing Stomatology Hospital
Nanjing Union Dental Clinic
Skoulnong General Hospital
SOS International Clinic

Shandong
Bellaire Medical Center (Medical Treatment for Expats), Qingdao

Shanghai

 Shanghai Medical College of Fudan University
 Zhongshan Hospital
 Huashan Hospital
 Huadong Hospital
 Children's Hospital of Fudan University
 Red House Hospital (Fudan OBGYN Hospital)
 Eye and ENT Hospital of Fudan University
 Shanghai Cancer Center
 Shanghai Fifth People's Hospital

 Shanghai Jiao Tong University School of Medicine
 Renji Hospital
 Ruijin Hospital
 Xinhua Hospital
 Shanghai First People's Hospital
 Shanghai Third People's Hospital
 Shanghai Sixth People's Hospital
 Shanghai Ninth People's Hospital
 Shanghai Chest Hospital
 Shanghai Mental Health Center
 Shanghai Children's Medical Center 
 Shanghai Children's Hospital
 International Peace Maternity and Child Health Hospital

 Shanghai Tongji University School of Medicine
 Tongji Hospital
 Shanghai Tenth People Hospital
 Shanghai East Hospital
 Shanghai Pulmonary Hospital
 Shanghai First Maternity and Infant Health Hospital
 Shanghai Yangpu Hospital
 Shanghai Yangzhi Rehabilitation Hospital

 Second Military Medical University
 Changhai Hospital
 Changzheng Hospital
 Eastern Hepatobiliary Surgery Hospital

 Others
 Shanghai Second People's Hospital
 Shanghai Eighth People's Hospital
 St Michael Hospital

Suzhou
Suzhou Medical College Hospitals

Tianjin

 Baodi District People's Hospital
 Cancer Hospital of Tianjin Medical University, Tianjin Cancer Hospital
 First Affiliated Hospital of Tianjin
 Integrative Medicine Hospital of Tianjin Nankai Hospital
 Obstetrics and Gynecology Hospital of Tianjin Center
 Pulmonary Tuberculosis Hospital in Tianjin, Tianjin
 Second Affiliated Hospital of Tianjin
 Second Affiliated Hospital of Tianjin Medical University
 Sino-Singapore Eco-City Hospital of Tianjin Medical University
 TEDA Hospital
 TEDA International Cardiovascular Hospital
 Third Affiliated Hospital of Tianjin Medical University
 Tianjin Amcare Women's & Children's Hospital
 Tianjin Anding Hospital
 Tianjin Changzheng Hospital
 Tianjin Chest Hospital
 Tianjin Children's Hospital
 Tianjin Dagang Hospital
 Tianjin Eye Hospital
 Tianjin First Central Hospital
 Tianjin Hospital
 Tianjin Infectious Diseases Hospital

 Tianjin Lake Hospital
 Tianjin Medical University Cancer Institute and Hospital
 Tianjin Medical University Dental Hospital
 Tianjin Medical University General Hospital
 Tianjin Mental Health Hospital
 Tianjin People's Hospital
 Tianjin People's Hospital (formerly Tianjin Second Central Hospital)
 Tianjin People's Hospital of Tianjin Riverside Hospital
 Tianjin Railway Central Hospital (formerly Tianjin Fourth Central Hospital)
 Tianjin Stomatological Hospital
 Tianjin TEDA Puhua International Hospital
 Tianjin Third Central Hospital (formerly the Hedong Hospital)
 Tianjin Traditional Chinese Medicine Hospital
 Tianjin United Family Hospital

Xinjiang

First Affiliated Hospital of XMU
Second Affiliated Hospital of XMU
Third Affiliated Hospital of XMU
Fourth Affiliated Hospital of XMU

Fifth Affiliated Hospital of XMU
Sixth Affiliated Hospital of XMU
People's Hospital of the Xinjiang Uyghur Autonomous Region

Wenzhou

The 1st Affiliated Hospital 
The 2nd Affiliated Hospital & Yuying Children's Hospital 
The 3rd Affiliated Hospital 
The 5th Affiliated Hospital 
The 6th Affiliated Hospital 

The Affiliated Eye Hospital 
The Affiliated Hospital of Stomatology 
The Affiliated Taizhou Hospital 
The Affiliated Wenling Hospital

See also
 History of hospitals
 List of Christian Hospitals in China

References